Word is a surname. Notable people with the surname include:

Barry Word (born 1964), American football player
James Word (born  1953), member of the Arkansas House of Representatives
Mark Word (born 1975), American football player
Robert L. Word (1866–1945), Justice of the Montana Supreme Court